Sopita Tanasan (born 23 December 1994) is a Thai weighlifter. She competed at the 2013 World Championships in the Women's 53 kg, winning the bronze medal. In 2016 Olympics, she competed at the 48 kg weight class and won gold.

In January 2019 she was issued a two-year doping ban until January 2021 after testing positive for 5a-androstane-3a, 17-bdiol (5aAdiol) and 5b-androstane-3a, 17 b-diol (5bAdiol).

Major result

References

External links
 
 
 
 

Sopita Tanasan
Living people
1994 births
Medalists at the 2016 Summer Olympics
Weightlifters at the 2016 Summer Olympics
Sopita Tanasan
Sopita Tanasan
World Weightlifting Championships medalists
Weightlifters at the 2014 Asian Games
Sopita Tanasan
Olympic medalists in weightlifting
Weightlifters at the 2018 Asian Games
Sopita Tanasan
Sopita Tanasan
Southeast Asian Games medalists in weightlifting
Competitors at the 2021 Southeast Asian Games
Sopita Tanasan
Sopita Tanasan